The 1988 Friuli-Venezia Giulia regional election took place on 26–27 June 1988.

Events
Christian Democracy was by far the largest party, largely ahead of the Italian Socialist Party and the Italian Communist Party. After the election Adriano Biasutti, the incumbent Christian Democratic President, formed a government with the Italian Socialist Party, the Italian Democratic Socialist Party and the Italian Republican Party. In 1992 Biasutti was replaced by fellow Christian Democrat Vinicio Turello.

Results
Sources: Istituto Cattaneo and Cjargne Online

References

Elections in Friuli-Venezia Giulia
1988 elections in Italy
June 1988 events in Europe